Panathottam is a 1963 Indian Tamil-language action drama film directed by K. Shankar. The film stars M. G. Ramachandran and B. Saroja Devi. It was released on 11 January 1963.

Plot 

Selvam is arrested on a false charge of passing counterfeit bills. He escapes and tries to put the hand on the real authors, that is, the leader of the band of the counterfeiters to be exonerated. His quest complicates when Natarajan, a firm policeman, dashes in his pursuit, convinced of his guilt.

Cast 
 M. G. Ramachandran as Selvam
 B. Saroja Devi as Kala
 Sheela as Meena
 S. V. Subbaiah as Ponnambalam
 M. N. Nambiar as Chidambaram
 S. A. Ashokan as Inspector Natarajan
 M. V. Rajamma as Thangamma
 C. Lakshmi Rajyam
 Nagesh as C. K. Ramu
Karikol Raju as Raju
A. Veerappan as  Ramu's friend
 V. P. S. Mani
 Thirupathisamy

Production 
Panathottam is named after the book of the same name by C. N. Annadurai. The climax began filming one day at 7:00am, and ended the next day at 7:00pm.

Soundtrack 
The music was composed by Viswanathan–Ramamoorthy, with lyrics by Kannadasan. The song "Pesuvathu Kiliya" is based on Bilaskhani Todi raga. It contains multiple references to Ramachandran's vital stats through its lyrics "Paaduvadhu kaviyaa illai, paarivallal magana; Seranukku uravaa senthamizhar nilava"; the line "Seranukku uravaa" refers to Ramachandran's place of birth Kerala, "paari vallal" references his perceived generous nature, and "senthamizhar" gives emphasis to Ramachandran's Tamil pride.

References

External links 

1960s action drama films
1960s Tamil-language films
1963 films
Films directed by K. Shankar
Films scored by Viswanathan–Ramamoorthy
Indian action drama films